Bryndwr is a suburb in the north-west of Christchurch, New Zealand.

Development
Bryndwr, meaning 'hillside by water' (from Bryn "hillside" + dŵr "by water"), and probably named for the slopes beside the Wairarapa and Waimairi streams which run through the suburb, is one of the few places in New Zealand with a name of Welsh origin. It was given this name by Charles Alured Jeffreys, (1821–1904) of Glandyfi, Machynlleth, Wales. He farmed this area after being given  freehold by his father-in-law Thomas Parr in 1851, who was granted Rural Section 188 from the Canterbury Association. Jeffreys also took a further  leasehold. He and his wife Clara Ellen emigrated on the Tasmania arriving in Lyttelton in 1853.

His land, sections 503 and 504, was known as Bryndwr Farm, Fendall Town. Jeffreys subdivided the land, selling 180 lots at auction as the "valuable suburb of Bryndwr", in 1880. Many streets he named in the area have Welsh associations including Jeffreys, Plynlimon, Penhelig, Glandovey (Anglicised over time from Glandyfi), Idris, (from Cadair Idris), Snowdon, Garreg, and Bryndwr Road. Jeffreys, his wife and daughter returned to Glandyfi castle after his elder brother, Edward, died in 1888.

A 1922 map of Christchurch shows "Bryndwr Station" railway station north of the intersection of Normans Road and Wairakei Road (then Wairarapa Road).
The farm owned by William Warner of Warner's Hotel in the Norman's Road area of Bryndwr was subdivided, and the Normans Road shops included the Warner farmhouse. In about 1957, the Roper's Foodmarket in this group of shops was designed by local architect Paul Pascoe.

Land was further subdivided during the 1940s, 1950s and 1960s, and these streets were laid out in the sinuous nested form of the Radburn design. The subdivision included the land that was the Bateman farm, on Greers Road, and extended between what is now Memorial Avenue, and Wairakei Road, and north of Wairakei Road including around the Greer homestead built in 1878, at what is now 302 Greers Road, and land owned by Christ's College, Christchurch. The houses along Wayside Avenue included exhibition homes.

Demographics

Bryndwr had a population of 9,288 at the 2018 New Zealand census, an increase of 219 people (2.4%) since the 2013 census, and an increase of 288 people (3.2%) since the 2006 census. There were 3,303 households. There were 4,626 males and 4,665 females, giving a sex ratio of 0.99 males per female, with 1,698 people (18.3%) aged under 15 years, 2,061 (22.2%) aged 15 to 29, 4,071 (43.8%) aged 30 to 64, and 1,455 (15.7%) aged 65 or older.

Ethnicities were 74.2% European/Pākehā, 8.6% Māori, 3.5% Pacific peoples, 20.0% Asian, and 3.0% other ethnicities (totals add to more than 100% since people could identify with multiple ethnicities).

The proportion of people born overseas was 30.6%, compared with 27.1% nationally.

Although some people objected to giving their religion, 45.8% had no religion, 41.3% were Christian, 1.4% were Hindu, 1.9% were Muslim, 1.5% were Buddhist and 2.8% had other religions.

Of those at least 15 years old, 2,397 (31.6%) people had a bachelor or higher degree, and 1,077 (14.2%) people had no formal qualifications. The employment status of those at least 15 was that 3,327 (43.8%) people were employed full-time, 1,317 (17.4%) were part-time, and 309 (4.1%) were unemployed.

According to the 2006 census, Bryndwr has a more multicultural demographic than the average for the Canterbury region, with slightly higher percentages of Asian, Middle eastern, and Pacific ethnicity, a higher proportion of people born overseas, and of those who speak a second language. There is also a higher proportion of professional people, as well as single parents and unemployed people. Bryndwr includes a small pocket of low socio-economic households, within which approximately half the houses are state houses. The remainder of Bryndwr is similar in socio-economic status to the adjacent suburbs of Merivale, Fendalton, Burnside and Papanui, but this pocket contrasts in particular with the neighbouring suburbs of Fendalton to the south and Merivale to the East, which are two of the highest socio-economic areas.

Facilities
As an older suburb, Bryndwr has well established cultural, sporting and commercial facilities, including a Council Service Centre, several schools and parks, and two supermarkets.

Shopping areas
"Elmwood Village" at the intersection of Norman's Road and Wairakei Road, (which in 1938 included the Bryndwr Bakery and the Bryndwr Butchery)
"Fendalton Village" at the intersection of Ilam Road and Clyde Road,
shops at the intersection of Wairakei Road and Aorangi Road,
the Wairakei Road shopping centre, at the intersection of Greers Road and Wairakei Road,
shops at the intersection of Harris Crescent and Blanch Street.

Community
The Christchurch City Council Fendalton Service Centre and Public Library are at the intersection of Jeffreys Road and Clyde Road.

Parks, sports and recreation

 of land for Jellie Park, in the Bryndwr/Burnside area, were donated in 1960 to the Waimairi County Council by James Jellie. The park, now 12 ha in area, has a large pond, sports fields, a skate park, and a swimming and gym complex, and a High Performance Sports Centre within a setting of lawn and large trees.
Edgar MacIntosh Park has sports fields, a playground, and an open-air paddling pool.
Derwent Reserve on Derwent Street is a local reserve with playground equipment.
Morley Reserve on the corner of Morley Street and Clyde Road is a local reserve with playground equipment, a Community Garden and a hall.
Pitcairn Playground on Pitcairn Crescent is a local reserve with playground equipment.
Jeffreys Reserve on Jeffreys Road has sports fields, playground equipment and tennis courts.
Otara Reserve on Clyde Road is a small reserve that provides a pedestrian connection between Otara Street and Clyde Road.
Plynlimon Park on Plynlimon Street has sports fields and playground equipment.

Schools
Wairakei School is located on Wairakei Road in Bryndwr, and teaches children from Year 1 to Year 6. It has  students. The school opened in 1950.

Allenvale School at 14A Aorangi Road teaches children from throughout Christchurch from Years 1–13 for those with specialist needs requiring Ongoing Resourcing under the Ongoing Resourcing Scheme (ORS). It has  students.

St Patrick's School at 57 Plynlimon Road is a Catholic state-integrated school for Years 1–8. It has  students. It opened in 1951.

Aorangi School, a primary school that was closed by the government in early 2010, was located in Bryndwr.

All these schools are coeducational. Rolls are as of

Elderly housing and care

There are several privately owned rental developments in Bryndwr available to residents 60 years old and over, as well as:
Aorangi Courts, 110 Aorangi Road, has Council owned rentable retirement housing
Jennifer Street, 21 Jennifer Street, has Council owned rentable retirement housing
Manor Place, 22a Manor Place, has Council owned rentable retirement housing
Torquay Place, 28 & 29 Torquay Place, has Council owned rentable retirement housing
Resolution Courts, 5 Resolution Place, has Council owned rentable retirement housing
Elmswood Retirement Village, 131 Wairakei Road, has Rest home care and purchasable residential units
Fendalton Retirement Village, 73 Bryndwr Road, has Rest home care and purchasable residential units
Radius Hawthorne, 10 St Winifreds Place, has hospital residential care, and specialist hospital and dementia residential care

Churches

Bryndwr Baptist Church, 309 Clyde Road
Bryndwr Chapel, 179 Idris Road
Christchurch Chinese Church, 286 Greers Road
Christ the King Catholic Church, 90 Greers Road
Elim Church, 193 Grahams Road
Saint Aidan's Anglican Church, 63 Brookside Terrace
St John's Methodist Church, at 49 Bryndwr Road, built in 1927, was most recently used by the Moraia Fijian Congregation, as part of the Christchurch North Methodist Parish, but has been closed because of damage in the 2011 Christchurch earthquake.
Saint Matthew's Catholic Church, 108 Jeffreys Road, which features a maquette "Angel of St Matthew" (1967) by Ria Bancroft
Saint Stephen's Presbyterian Church, 365A Ilam Road
Saint Thomas's Anglican Church, 17 Strowan Road

Waterways
Waterways that begin in or pass through the suburb are tributaries to the Avon River. They include: 
Dudley Creek which begins in the suburb of Bishopdale, crosses Greers Road and parallels Condell Avenue while meandering toward the suburb of Papanui
Wai iti Stream which begins near Sealy Place, parallels Brookside Terrace and Wai iti Terrace, crossing Clyde Road to join the Wairarapa Stream
Hewlings Stream which passes through the Burnside High School grounds, crosses Greers Road to Jellie Park where it swells to become the lake, then joins Wairarapa Stream
Jellie Park artesian bore that spills through a water feature into Jellie Park Lake
Jellie Park Lake fed by the bore and Hewlings Stream
Wairarapa Stream which runs from the west side of Grahams Road, paralleling Wayside Avenue and crossing Greers Road to parallel Truman Road beside the north side of Jellie Park then crosses and briefly parallels Ilam Road, runs alongside the Cobham Intermediate School grounds, crosses Clyde Road, runs to the Waiwetu reserve then turns to cross Glandovey Road then Idris Road.

Notable residents
 C. E. Beeby ONZ CMG, educationalist, lived at 15 Wairarapa Tce.
 Wing Commander Johnny Checketts, RNZAF
 John Key, Prime Minister of New Zealand (2008–2016), grew up in a state house on Hollyford Avenue in Bryndwr.

References

External links
History of Bryndwr and Burnside – Christchurch City Libraries
 Wairakei School
 Burnside High School
 Cobham Intermediate School
Jellie Park Recreation and Sport Centre – Christchurch City Council

Suburbs of Christchurch
Radburn design housing estates